The  George Halas Award is given by the Pro Football Writers of America (PFWA) to a National Football League (NFL) player, coach or staff member who overcomes the most adversity to succeed.

The award is named for George Halas, a charter member (1963) of the Pro Football Hall of Fame who was associated with the Chicago Bears and NFL from their inception in 1920 until his death in 1983 as an owner, manager, player and promoter.

Halas represented the Bears, then known as the Decatur Staleys, at the Sept. 17, 1920 organizational meeting of the American Football Association in Canton, Ohio. One year later, the AFA became known as the National Football League.

Halas’ teams won six NFL titles in his 40 seasons as the Bears’ coach. His 318 regular-season wins and 324 total victories were long-standing NFL records until broken by Don Shula in 1993.

In 1970, the George Halas Award went to Gale Sayers for his comeback from knee surgery to lead the NFL in rushing in 1969. Sayers gave an emotional speech that was memorialized in the film Brian's Song. Said Sayers, "You flatter me by giving me this award, but I’ll tell you here and now that I accept it for Brian Piccolo. Brian Piccolo is the man of courage who should receive the George S. Halas Award. I accept it tonight, but I’ll present it to Brian tomorrow. I love Brian Piccolo. And I’d like all of you to love him, too. And tonight, when you hit your knees, ask God to love him, too."

Other notable winners of the George Halas Award include Joe Namath, Steeler running back Rocky Bleier, Hall of Fame cornerback Jimmy Johnson, New York Giant cancer survivor Karl Nelson, Hall of Famers Dan Hampton and Joe Montana, Denver Broncos guard Mark Schlereth, former N.Y. Giant Kerry Collins, San Francisco 49ers Garrison Hearst and Bryant Young, coach and former linebacker Sam Mills, Dolphins running back Robert Edwards, linebacker Mark Fields, former head coach Tony Dungy, former New Orleans Saints quarterback Drew Brees, New England Patriots owner Robert Kraft, and former Saints safety and ALS advocate Steve Gleason.

Winners

See also
 List of National Football League awards

References

External links

American football trophies and awards
National Football League trophies and awards
Awards established in 1969